This is a list of episodes from the second season of Happy Days.

Cast

Main
 Ron Howard as Richie Cunningham
 Marion Ross as Marion Cunningham
 Anson Williams as Warren "Potsie" Weber
 Don Most as Ralph Malph
 Henry Winkler as Arthur "Fonzie" Fonzarelli
 Tom Bosley as Howard Cunningham

Guest
 Erin Moran as Joanie Cunningham
 Randolph Roberts as Chuck Cunningham
 Beatrice Colen as Marsha Simms
Neil J. Schwartz as "Bag" Zombroski
 Misty Rowe as Wendy
 Linda Purl as Gloria
Danny Butch as Raymond "Spike" Fonzarelli
 Maureen McCormick as Hildie

Broadcast history
The season originally aired Tuesdays at 8:00-8:30 pm (EST).

Episodes

Consisted of 23 episodes airing on ABC.
This is the last season of the series where Rock Around the Clock is the theme song. The song did not appear on the Season 2 DVD release due to music licensing issues, so they replaced it with Norman Gimbel and Charles Fox's "Happy Days".
This is the last season to have the original version of "Happy Days" as the closing theme. Henry Winkler and Donny Most were added to the opening credits.

References

Happy Days 02
1974 American television seasons
1975 American television seasons